is the 18th single by Japanese idol girl group Nogizaka46. It was released on 9 August 2017. It reached number one on the weekly Oricon Singles Chart with 880,018 copies sold. It was also number one on the Billboard Japan Hot 100.

Release 
This single was released in 5 versions. Type-A, Type-B, Type-C, Type-D and a regular edition.

Track listing
All lyrics written by Yasushi Akimoto.

Type-A

Type-B

Type-C

Type-D

Regular Edition

Participating members

"Nigemizu" 
Center: Yūki Yoda and Momoko Ōzono

3rd Row: Marika Itō, Mai Shinuchi, Rina Ikoma, Reika Sakurai, Yumi Wakatsuki, Sayuri Inoue

2nd Row: Minami Hoshino, Sayuri Matsumura, Erika Ikuta, Manatsu Akimoto, Misa Etō, Kazumi Takayama

1st Row: Asuka Saitō, Mai Shiraishi, Momoko Ozonō, Yūki Yoda, Nanase Nishino, Miona Hori

"Hitonatsu no Nagasa yori…"

Centre: Manatsu Akimoto and Sayuri Matsumura

1st Gen: Manatsu Akimoto, Erika Ikuta, Rina Ikoma, Marika Itō, Sayuri Inoue, Misa Etō, Asuka Saitō, Reika Sakurai, Mai Shiraishi, Kazumi Takayama, Nanase Nishino, Minami Hoshino, Sayuri Matsumura, Yumi Wakatsuki 

2nd Gen: Mai Shinuchi, Miona Hori

3rd Gen: Momoko Ōzono, Yūki Yoda

Chart performance

Oricon

Billboard Japan

Year end

References

2017 singles
2017 songs
Japanese-language songs
Nogizaka46 songs
Oricon Weekly number-one singles
Billboard Japan Hot 100 number-one singles
Song articles with missing songwriters
Songs with lyrics by Yasushi Akimoto